Brucellosis vaccine is a vaccine for cattle, sheep and goats used against brucellosis. It is an attenuated vaccine based on a modified brucellosis bacteria.

Currently, there is no vaccine available for humans.

References

Animal vaccines